The Scottish Rally Championship is a rallying series run throughout Scotland over the course of a year, that comprises both gravel and tarmac surface rallies. The 2021 series was to begin on the forest tracks around Inverness on 6 March, with the season finale due to take place around Dalbeattie on 11 September.

2021 calendar
For season 2021 there was to be seven events held on both gravel and tarmac surfaces. The 2021 reserve event will be the Carlisle Stages Rally in October.

Calendar Changes
The first three rounds of the series, the Snowman Rally, the Speyside Stages and the Jim Clark Reivers Rally have been cancelled due to the ongoing COVID-19 pandemic.

2021 events podium

Drivers Points Classification

Points are awarded to the highest placed registered driver on each event as follows: 30, 28, 27, 26, and so on down to 1 point. 
At the end of the Championship, competitors will count their best 4 scores out of the 5 events as his/her final overall Championship score.

References

External links
 
 RSAC Scottish Rally Homepage

Scottish Rally Championship seasons
Scottish Rally Championship
Scottish Rally Championship
Scottish Rally Championship